Thomas E. Ammann (1950 – 9 June 1993) was a leading Swiss art dealer in Impressionist and twentieth century art, and a collector of post-war and contemporary art.

Life

Born 1950 in Ermatingen, Switzerland, as the youngest of four children (Eveline, Doris, Susan), Ammann became an art collector while still a teenager. Aged 18 he went to work at Galerie Bruno Bischofberger in Zurich. It was during this time of apprenticeship that Ammann first met Andy Warhol who would become a close friend.  In 1977 Ammann went into business for himself. His combination of knowledge, eye for quality, charm, humor, looks, and discretion took him to the top of the art world by his mid 30s (Skis with Valentino, dines with Audrey Hepburn and Elizabeth Taylor ... lives on the Concorde. He was named to the International Best Dressed List Hall of Fame in 1988.

Ammann died on 9 June 1993, prematurely at the age of 43 of an AIDS related illness at the Bircher-Benner Clinic in Zurich. A memorial service was held at the Church of St. Peter in Zurich  and subsequently at The Solomon R. Guggenheim Museum in New York City on 18 November 1993, with speakers Patricia Phelps de Cisneros, Thomas Krens, William H. Luers, Ernst Beyeler, Robert Wilson (director), Bob Colacello, Bianca Jagger and artists Ross Bleckner, Francesco Clemente, and Eric Fischl.

Gallery

In 1977 Ammann established his own gallery, Thomas Ammann Fine Art which was soon visited by major collectors. Its patrons included Giovanni Agnelli, Gustavo Cisneros, David Geffen, Ronald Lauder, Dinos Martinos, Samuel Newhouse Jr, Stavros Niarchos, Ronald Perelman, Yves Saint Laurent and Baron Hans Heinrich Thyssen-Bornemisza.
From his villa by Otto Rudolf Salvisberg on the hill of Zurich, his chalet in Gstaad or his apartment at the Pierre in New York, Ammann dealt mainly in paintings and sculpture by twentieth century artists including Francis Bacon, Balthus, Max Beckmann, Constantin Brâncuși, Georges Braque, Alexander Calder, Alberto Giacometti, Wassily Kandinsky, Ernst Ludwig Kirchner, Paul Klee, Willem de Kooning, Fernand Léger, Henri Matisse, Joan Miró, Barnett Newman, Pablo Picasso and Mark Rothko.

Due to Ammann's discretion and secrecy in business, only a few prime examples of artworks which found way into the world's great museums through his hands are known, such as Max Ernst's The Blessed Virgin Chastises the Infant Jesus Before Three Witnesses in the collection of the Ludwig Museum in Cologne or Vincent van Gogh's Portrait of Joseph Roulin which Ammann sold to the Museum of Modern Art in New York.  Ammann was a major player in the international art auctions in London and New York. The press noted "his presence in the worlds salesrooms created a mood of optimism, whatever the market conditions, and his enthusiastic bids for paintings by Cy Twombly and Andy Warhol were driven by genuine passion as much as potential profit". Ammann started organizing at his gallery from 1987.

Thomas Ammann Fine Art was directed by Ammann's second oldest sister Doris, who co-founded the gallery in 1977 and worked as its financial administrator. until her brother died in 1993. Thomas Ammann Fine Art exclusively represents the work of Brice Marden in Europe and since 1999 works closely with The Willem de Kooning Foundation, New York and represents the artist's work in Europe. Doris died in 2021.

Tobias Mueller Ammann, his sole nephew, was managing director of Zurich's Galerie Bruno Bischofberger between 1995 and 2016, after working for Christie's in London and Athens. In 2016 he established his own gallery Tobias Mueller Modern Art in Zurich.

Collection

Besides becoming the leading dealer of his generation by the end of the 1980s and playing in the first league of older dealers such as William Acquavella and Ernst Beyeler, Ammann was an equally keen supporter and friend of contemporary artists, whose works he exclusively purchased for his own collection. A small selection of his holdings were exhibited at the Kunsthalle Basel in 1985 with the title "From Twombly to Clemente - Selected works from a private collection", curated by the well known art critic and former museum director Jean-Christophe Ammann (no relation). The art world agreed on Thomas Ammann's collection of works of the second half of the twentieth century to be amongst the finest in existence, with unparalleled workgroups of artists such as Andy Warhol, Cy Twombly, Brice Marden, Robert Ryman, Sigmar Polke, Eric Fischl, Francesco Clemente and Neil Jenney. The funding for the collection was provided by his childhood friend and fellow art enthusiast Alexander Schmidheiny, who shared with him the goal of establishing a first-rate collection of contemporary art. Living up to his maxim "You shall not collect what you want to sell", Ammann strictly divided his dealing in early twentieth-century art from his collecting postwar and contemporary works. Following the untimely deaths of Alexander Schmidheiny in 1992 and Thomas Ammann in 1993, the collection was inherited by their siblings. Doris Ammann exhibits some of the inherited works as private loans, while Stephan Schmidheiny transferred his share to the newly created Daros Collection.

Philanthropy

Ammann was an early supporter in the fight against AIDS, the illness many prominent figures from the artworld fell victim to. The evening of 2 May 1988, following the auction of the Andy Warhol Collection at Sotheby's in New York, Ammann orchestrated a benefit auction which raised nearly two million US dollars. Ammann convinced artist friends from Jasper Johns to Cy Twombly to donate works to the auction he co-hosted with Patricia Buckley, the proceeds of which went to the supportive care programme of St. Vincent's Hospital and Medical Center of New York.

In 1991 as chairman of the international programme, Thomas Ammann organized and hosted the Art Against Aids (AmFAR) gala dinner and 1.5 million dollar fund-raiser at the opening of the art fair Basel with Elizabeth Taylor and Audrey Hepburn for some 500 guests, among them the biggest names from the art and entertainment worlds.

Andy Warhol catalogue raisonné

It was in 1977 that Ammann envisioned a catalogue raisonné of all of Andy Warhol's paintings, sculptures and drawings, and with the artist's consent, started the vast undertaking of assembling the material needed for such a project to finally create a comprehensive, scholarly and authoritative publication. The initial volumes were eventually published in 2002 and 2004 by Phaidon Press in a joint effort of Thomas Ammann Fine Art and the Andy Warhol Foundation for the Visual Arts Inc, New York.

Publications
 From Twombly to Clemente - Selected works from a Private Collection, Kunsthalle Basel, 1985
 Andy Warhol Catalogue Raisonné Vol. I  (1961-1963)
 Andy Warhol Catalogue Raisonné Vol. II (1964-1969) 
 Andy Warhol Catalogue Raisonné Vol. III (1970-1974)

References

External links
Thomas Ammann Fine Art

Swiss art dealers
Swiss art collectors
20th-century Swiss businesspeople
1950 births
1993 deaths
AIDS-related deaths in Switzerland
20th-century Swiss LGBT people